Danilo Burgos (born 1979) is an American politician serving as a member of the Pennsylvania House of Representatives from the 197th district. Elected in November 2018, he assumed office on January 2, 2019.

Early life and education 
Burgos was born in New York City, the son of immigrants from the Dominican Republic. His family moved to Philadelphia when he was 10. Growing up, his family operated a grocery store. Burgos graduated from Olney High School.

Career 
Burgos opened a grocery store in 1998 and co-founded the Philadelphia Dominican Grocers Association. He also worked for city councilors Allan Domb and Maria Quiñones-Sánchez. When Burgos assumed office in 2019, he became the first Dominican-American to elected to the Pennsylvania General Assembly. During the 2019–2020 legislative session, Burgos served as secretary of the House Agriculture & Rural Affairs Committee. During the 2020 presidential election, Burgos was a member of the Joe Biden's Latino Leadership Council.

References 

American politicians of Dominican Republic descent
Living people
People from Philadelphia
Politicians from Philadelphia
Hispanic and Latino American people in Pennsylvania politics
Hispanic and Latino American state legislators in Pennsylvania
Democratic Party members of the Pennsylvania House of Representatives
1979 births